The Faizabad Superfast Express, officially known as the Mumbai Ltt Ayodhya Cantt Sf Express, is a train which runs weekly connecting  (officially Ayodhya Cantt) to , Mumbai. It is one of the two trains connecting cities of Faizabad and Ayodhya to Mumbai; the other is the Saket Express, which runs twice a week. It is numbered as 22103/22104.

Stoppage
Total: 15 stops.

From LTT to Faizabad Jn.
Mumbai LTT→→→→→→→→→→→Janghai Junction→Mariahu→→Shahganj Junction→→Faizabad Junction

From Faizabad Jn. to LTT
Faizabad Junction→→Shahganj Junction→→Mariahu→Janghai Junction→→→→→→→→→→→Mumbai LTT

Timings

Train no. 22103 (from LTT to Faizabad Jn.)

Train no. 22104 (from Faizabad Jn. to LTT)

See also
 Saket Express
 Faizabad railway station
 Ayodhya railway station
 Jaunpur Junction

References

Transport in Mumbai
Trains from Faizabad
Express trains in India
Rail transport in Madhya Pradesh
Rail transport in Maharashtra
Railway services introduced in 2011